Abdullah Faraj (Arabic:عبد الله فرج) (born 27 September 1986) is an Emirati footballer. He currently plays .

External links

References

Emirati footballers
1986 births
Living people
Al Jazira Club players
Al Dhafra FC players
Al-Ittihad Kalba SC players
Emirates Club players
Al Shabab Al Arabi Club Dubai players
Fujairah FC players
Al Dhaid SC players
Al Bataeh Club players
Place of birth missing (living people)
UAE First Division League players
UAE Pro League players
Association football fullbacks